Corjeuți is a village in Briceni District, Moldova.

References

Villages of Briceni District
Khotinsky Uyezd